Warluwarra is an extinct Australian Aboriginal language of Queensland. Waluwarra (also known as Warluwarra, Walugara, and Walukara) has a traditional language region in the local government area of Shire of Boulia, including Walgra Station and Wolga, from Roxborough Downs north to Carandotta Station and Urandangi on the Georgina River, on Moonah Creek to Rochedale, south-east of Pituri Creek.

Classification
R. M. W. Dixon (2002) places Warluwara in the Southern Ngarna subgroup, along with Wagaya, Yindjilandji, and Bularnu. This is in turn related to Yanyuwa.

Sign 
The Warluwara had a developed signed form of their language.

References

 Roth, Walter E. (1897). The expression of ideas by manual signs: a sign-language. (p. 273–301) Reprinted from Roth, W.E. Ethnological studies among the North-West-Central Queensland Aborigines. London, Queensland Agent-Generals Information Office, 1897; 71–90; Information collected from the following tribes; Pitta-Pitta, Boinji, Ulaolinya, Wonkajera, Walookera [= Warluwarra], Undekerebina, Kalkadoon, Mitakoodi, Woonamurra, Goa. Reprinted (1978) in Aboriginal sign languages of the Americas and Australia. New York: Plenum Press, vol. 2.

Ngarna languages
Extinct languages of Queensland
Extinct sign languages